Seven referendums were held in Switzerland in 1972. The first two were held on 5 March on a popular initiative on the promotion of housebuilding (and a counter-proposal) and on an amendment to the Swiss Federal Constitution to protect tenants. The popular initiative was rejected, whilst the constitutional amendment was approved. The third and fourth were held on 4 June on measures to stabilise the federal construction market and protecting currency, both of which were approved. The fifth was held on 24 September on a popular initiative for enhanced arms control and a ban on weapon exports, but was narrowly rejected. The final two were held on 3 December on a popular initiative on introducing a "people's pension" (and a counterproposal) and on an agreement with the European Community. The pensions initiative was rejected, whilst the agreement was approved.

Results

March: Housebuilding

March: Protection of tenants

June: Construction market

June: Currency protection

September: Arms control

December: People's pension

December: Agreement with the European Community

References

Swiss referendums
Referendums
Swiss referendums
Swiss referendums
Swiss referendums
Swiss referendums
1972
Pension referendums